Komani Psychiatric Hospital is a government funded psychiatric hospital and drug rehabilitation centre in Queenstown, Eastern Cape in South Africa.

The hospital departments include a Rehabilitation Centre, pharmacy, Anti-Retroviral (ARV) treatment for HIV/AIDS, Post Trauma Counseling Services, Laundry Services and Kitchen Services.

External links
Komani Psychiatrict Hospital

Psychiatric hospitals in South Africa
Enoch Mgijima Local Municipality